It's Everybody's War was a short dramatic propaganda film produced by 20th Century Fox and distributed by the Office of War Information in 1942.

The film is set up to show the chronological effects of the war on a typical American small town. Two years ago they sent off their company of the National Guard, but didn't think they would actually go to battle. They first get sanguine letters home about training and being stationed in the Philippines, without a thought to the possibility of combat. Then the Japanese invade the Philippines. Over winter 1941 and 1942, one by one, many of the parents get telegrams from the government saying that their children have died. People start joining the war effort with bravado, but then slack off, taking days off work and wasting resources, until May 6, 1942, when Corregidor falls, and the rest of the company is taken prisoner by the Japanese.

The town then rallies, and more and more people go to work for war industries, go without luxuries to supply more materiel, and buy bonds. The next time that their company goes of to the front, they will have more planes, more tires, and better equipment, and they won't have to surrender.

See also 
 List of Allied propaganda films of World War II
United States home front during World War II

References

External links 
 
 
 It's Everybody's War at the National Archives and Records Administration

1942 films
1940s war films
American World War II propaganda shorts
American black-and-white films
1940s American films
1940s English-language films